Ganga Mahasabha is an Indian organisation working for the conservation of Ganges river, founded by Madan Mohan Malviya in 1905.  National River Ganga Act 2012- aimed at addressing pollution in the river Ganges- was proposed by the Mahasabha but not drafted by the Indian government.

Notes

1905 establishments in India
Nature conservation in India
Nature conservation organisations based in India
Ganges
Organizations established in 1905
Madan Mohan Malaviya